The SS Meriwether Lewis (Hull Number 170) was a Liberty ship built in the United States during World War II. She was named after Meriwether Lewis, an American explorer who, along with William Clark, led the Corps of Discovery which explored the American West.

The ship was laid down on 19 May 1941, then launched on 19 October 1941. 
She was operated by the American Mail Line under  charter with the Maritime Commission and War Shipping Administration. On February 7, 1943, the ship left New York as part of convoy HX 227, "bound for the United Kingdom and then to Murmansk, Russia." According to  the German Navy, in the early morning of March 2, she was identified as a straggler separated from her convoy; an initial attack by  failed due to engine problems. U-759 then contacted , leading  it to SS Meriwether Lewis. One of four initial torpedoes stopped her; the second of two more torpedoes detonated the ship's ammunition cargo.  She sank in the North Atlantic Ocean on 3 March 1943, southwest of Iceland at position .

By the time  arrived at the site of the attack, all that was found was a 30-mile line of floating tires.  There were no survivors from her crew.

References

Liberty ships
Ships sunk by German submarines in World War II
World War II shipwrecks in the Atlantic Ocean
1941 ships
Maritime incidents in March 1943
Ships lost with all hands
Ships built in Portland, Oregon